Konstantinos Meretsolias (born 23 August 1998) is a Greek swimmer. He competed in the 2020 Summer Olympics.

References

1998 births
Living people
Swimmers at the 2020 Summer Olympics
Greek male swimmers
Olympic swimmers of Greece
20th-century Greek people
21st-century Greek people
Mediterranean Games competitors for Greece
Swimmers at the 2022 Mediterranean Games